Gerad may refer to:

A Somali court title for a king or sultan
Gerad Adams (born 1978), a Canadian ice hockey player and coach
Gerad Parker (born 1981), an American football coach
Gerad Tehran Club, an Iranian professional wrestling team
Edgar Figaro, a fictional king from Final Fantasy VI who uses "Gerad" as a pseudonym

See also

Gerald, a male given name
Gerard, a male given name